The Autotrader EchoPark Automotive 400 is a NASCAR Cup Series stock car race held at the Texas Motor Speedway in Fort Worth, Texas. The inaugural race took place on November 6, 2005. The race has always started in the late afternoon, gone through sunset and twilight, and ended under the lights at night, much like the Coca-Cola 600 in May, but it is not considered a night event.

The race was acquired as a result of the Ferko lawsuit, which forced NASCAR to relinquish the sport's fourth major, the Mountain Dew Southern 500 and in the process end its Grand Slam, as the Southern 500 was one of the four races that made it up. This race has been derisively referred to as the Francis Ferko 500, mostly by traditionalist fans upset by the demise of the Southern 500.

The trophy is in the shape of a cowboy hat on top of a piston. Traditionally, the winning driver wears a black cowboy hat and fires a couple of six-shooters in the air on victory lane.

This race is featured in the 2006 film Talladega Nights: The Ballad of Ricky Bobby, but it was actually shot at the identically shaped Charlotte Motor Speedway with the wall painted to look like Texas.

Tyler Reddick is the defending winner of the event, having won it in 2022.

The race was shortened from 500 miles to 400 miles starting in 2023.

History

 2005: The inaugural Fall race saw Carl Edwards dominate the second half of the race. With 15 laps to go, the caution came out for debris. Most of the leaders stayed out, but Edwards took two right-sides to restart 6th with 11 laps to go. Edwards charged through traffic to deny Mark Martin (who stayed out) from becoming the first repeat winner in Texas Motor Speedway history by passing him on the penultimate lap. Edwards became the 10th different winner in 10 races.
 2006: Tony Stewart led 278 of 339 laps to become the 12th different winner in 12 races. Despite the record for most laps led in one event, Stewart has the record of most laps led by a race winner.
 2007: Jimmie Johnson's path to his second-straight Cup title saw him win his third-straight Cup race after dueling with Matt Kenseth in the closing laps. Johnson would go on to win the next week for 4 in a row to seal a 10-win season.
 2008: Carl Edwards' win makes him the first driver to sweep both races at Texas and the first 3-time winner at TMS. He was able to eke out the final 69 laps on his final tank of gas and coast to victory.
 2009: Kyle Busch and Kurt Busch dominated the race as the brothers swapped the lead at different points in the race leading a combined 321 of 334 laps. Coming down to fuel mileage, Kyle had led 232 laps and was on his way to a dominant win until he ran out with less than 3 to go. Brother Kurt led 89 laps and was able to stretch his gas tank to win the event by over 25 seconds as others were running out of gas. Aside from the Busch brothers, only Denny Hamlin (2 laps led) and Jeff Gordon (11 laps led) led laps.
 2010: Denny Hamlin became the second driver to sweep both races at Texas when he won the Samsung Mobile 500 and the AAA Texas 500. Also, around mid-race, a shoving match occurred when Jeff Burton and Jeff Gordon crashed in turn 2.
 2011: Tony Stewart's surge towards the 2011 Cup championship continued between him and Carl Edwards, a theme through the 2011 Cup Playoffs. Stewart dominated and won his fourth race in eight starts since he went winless during the regular season, with Edwards finishing 2nd. Eddie Gossage, the track's president awarded Stewart with a robe and a pair of boxing gloves to continue the Stewart-Edwards battle. It was Tony's second win at Texas, having won 5 years prior.
 2012: The first 100 laps of the race went green, combine that with the last 234 laps of the April 2012 race that went green, means a total of 334 consecutive laps were run caution-free, a full scheduled race at Texas. Jimmie Johnson won, for his 60th NASCAR Cup Series win, and also Chevrolet's 700th win.
 2013: Johnson's second consecutive fall win makes him Texas Motor Speedway's second 3-time winner, putting him in a tie with Carl Edwards.
 2014: Johnson took his third straight win in the fall race, leading 191 of 341 laps. On a green-white-checkered restart, Brad Keselowski tried to go three-wide and made contact with Jeff Gordon , cutting Gordon's left rear tire and causing him to spin in turn 4. Gordon lost a lap and finished 29th while Keselowski finished third. Tempers boiled over, escalating into a post-race brawl on pit road between Keselowski, Gordon, and their pit crews that were apparently instigated by Kevin Harvick.
 2015: In the 2015 running, Jimmie Johnson grabbed his fourth straight win in the fall race and became the third driver in the track's history to sweep both races at Texas, as well as winning his third consecutive event at the track. Brad Keselowski led 312 of 334 laps (a track record). Dale Earnhardt Jr. tagged the wall with his right-rear corner. This affected the handling of his car and he began to fall back through the field. He spun in the turn 3 apron on lap 167, Kevin Harvick made an unscheduled stop with 53 laps to go for a flat right-rear tire. He fell to 20th–place in the running order and down a lap. Carl Edwards kicked off the final cycle of pit stops with 38 laps to go. Keselowski hit pit road with 37 laps to go and the lead cycled to Harvick. Denny Hamlin was tagged for speeding on pit road and was forced to serve a drive-through penalty. On 16-lap older tires, he was no match for Keselowski as he was passed with ease with 35 laps to go. Keselowski was leading in the closing laps, a few circuits away from locking a spot in the Championship 4 at Homestead. His dominant performance did not end with the win as Johnson got around Brad with 4 laps to go, settling for 2nd. The next week, Keselowski had no luck and failed to advance to the Championship 4.
 2016: Originally scheduled to be broadcast on NBC, the 2016 running was moved to NBCSN due to inclement weather, Carl Edwards grabbed the win after the race was called for inclement weather after 293 laps. It would turn out to be Edward's final Cup win before abruptly announcing his retirement after the 2016 season. As of 2020, this is the only Cup race at Texas that has failed to go the scheduled distance.
 2017: Kevin Harvick took advantage of lapped traffic holding up leader Martin Truex Jr. and take the lead with 10 to go in the first Fall race on the new configuration. It was Harvick's first win at Texas Motor Speedway in his 30th start at the track.
 2018: Harvick won the race in dominating fashion, but he along with Ryan Blaney who finished second, and Erik Jones who finished fourth all failed post-race tech. Kevin's win would be encumbered and would have to sweat out to point his way to the Championship 4. The scenario would later fuel the fans' desire to see a winning car that fails tech be disqualified and stripped of the win. In 2019, NASCAR came up with the rule that has been used since. As soon as the winning car is wheeled out of victory circle, it undergoes post-race tech that takes 90-120 minutes immediately, and the results of if it passed or failed are confirmed that day, knowing who the winner is instead of a few days later. Had the rule been in effect at the time, third-place finisher Joey Logano would have won the race.
 2019: Harvick won the fall race at Texas for the third year in a row in dominating fashion, this time passing post-race tech to advance to the Championship 4.

 2020: The race was red-flagged on Sunday on lap 52 due to rain and mist and would be subject to the longest red-flag in NASCAR's history, first being postponed to the following Monday morning, then again to Tuesday afternoon due to the same inclement weather, then again a third time to Wednesday afternoon as a result of the mist, a total of nearly 72 hours. Rather ironically, the two most prominent drivers retiring at the end of the year, Clint Bowyer and Jimmie Johnson, were scored 1st and 2nd, respectively, at the time of the red flag. After the race resumed, Kyle Busch held off Martin Truex Jr. to claim his first Cup Series win of the 2020 season, keeping a 16-year winning streak alive (since 2005 when he became a full-time driver). It snapped a 33-race winless skid, with his last being at Homestead in November 2019 when he won the race and championship. Kyle also tied Carl Edwards for second-most wins at Texas with his 4th.
 2021: Kyle Larson won his eighth race of the season en route to winning the championship that year. This win also made him sweep the 2021 Cup Series races at Texas as he also won the 2021 NASCAR All-Star Race earlier in the year at the track.
 2022: The race was marred with controversy, with a record of 16 cautions throughout the race. Most of them were for tire failures in turn 4. Cody Ware would crash head-on into the turn 4 wall on lap 168, then careened down pit road almost hitting the pit road opening to the garage at high speed. Kevin Harvick, Martin Truex, Jr., and Chase Elliott would all suffer tire blowouts while leading that took them out of contention, while playoff drivers Alex Bowman and Christopher Bell would crash from tire failures (Bowman would later revealed to have suffered from a concussion-like symptoms from the crash that sat him out of the next race). During a caution period for Truex's incident,  William Byron shoved Denny Hamlin on the tri-oval from 2nd spinning Hamlin out in retaliation from Hamlin running Byron into the turn 2 wall earlier in the race. NASCAR officials missed the replay of the incident and instead sent Hamlin to 15th for not maintaining position under caution while Byron was fined $50,000 and docked 25 driver and owner points two days after the race. Ty Gibbs was also fined $75,000 and docked 25 owner points (as he is competing for the Xfinity points, he could not receive or lose Cup points) for contact with Ty Dillon on the pit road, the second time in a year for Gibbs. Tyler Reddick would go on to win the race for his 3rd win with Richard Childress Racing and becoming the 4th non-playoff driver in a row to win a race, after being eliminated from the Round of 16 by 2 points.

Past winners

Notes
2006, 2012, 2014, and 2018: Race extended due to a NASCAR Overtime finish. 2014 took two attempts.
2016: Race shortened due to rain.
2020: Race started on Sunday, was suspended multiple times due to rain and persistent moisture, and finished on Wednesday.

Multiple winners (drivers)

Multiple winners (teams)

Manufacturer wins

References

External links
 

Texas
 
NASCAR Cup Series races
2005 establishments in Texas
Recurring sporting events established in 2005
Annual sporting events in the United States
November 2005 sports events in the United States